5 Gallons of Diesel is a retrospective music DVD featuring Les Claypool and his various side projects. Released on November 15, 2005 by Prawn Song Records, the DVD contains 3.5 hours of music videos, live performances, and other miscellaneous video material pertaining to Claypool and his music.

Track listing

Extras

External links
5 Gallons of Diesel at the Les Claypool official website

Les Claypool video albums
2005 video albums
Prawn Song Records video albums
Live video albums
2005 live albums